The 14K (十四K) is a triad group based in Hong Kong but active internationally. It is the second largest triad group in the world with around 20,000 members split into thirty subgroups. They are the main rival of the Sun Yee On, which is the largest triad.

Criminal focus 
The 14K is responsible for large-scale drug trafficking around the world, most of it heroin and opium from China or Southeast Asia. This is their primary business in terms of generating income, but they are also involved in illegal gambling, loan sharking, money laundering, contract murder, arms trafficking, prostitution, human trafficking, extortion, counterfeiting and, to a lesser extent, home invasion robberies.

History 
The 14K was formed by Kuomintang Lieutenant-General Kot Siu-wong in Guangzhou, China in 1945 as an anti-Communist action group. However, the group relocated to Hong Kong in 1949 when the Kuomintang fled from the Communists following the Chinese Civil War. Originally there were fourteen members who were part of the Kuomintang, hence the name 14K. However, other sources say 14 stands for the road number of a former headquarters and K stands for Kowloon.

Compared with other triad societies, the 14K is one of the largest and most violent Hong Kong-based triad societies, and its members appear to be more loosely connected. 14K factional violence is out of control because no dragonhead is able to govern all factions of 14K worldwide. 

While Hong Kong's 14K triad gang dominates its traditional areas of operation and has expanded far beyond the former British colony, its focus remains Sinocentric. Hong Kong triads, including the 14K, have also expanded their activities in mainland China; a key motivation for members to cross into China is to avoid police security and anti-gang crackdowns in Hong Kong.

During the 1956 riots, the 14K Triad confronted the colonial government at the time. The riot caused 60 deaths and over 400 hospitalizations. After the riot, the colonial government would then arrest over 10,000 14K members with 600 of them being deported to Taiwan. The government would then create the Triad Societies Bureau in order to assist law enforcement in combating triad activities.

In 1997, there were a number of gang-related attacks that left 14 people dead. Under Wan Kuok-koi (nicknamed "Broken Tooth Koi", 崩牙駒), the 14K was being challenged by the smaller Shui Fong Triad. The next year, a gunman believed to be connected to the local 14K killed a Portuguese national and wounded another at a pavement café in Macau. In 1999, a Portuguese court convicted 45-year-old mob boss Broken Tooth Koi on various criminal charges and sentenced him to 15 years' imprisonment. His 14K gang was suspected of drive-by shootings, car bombings and attempted assassinations. Seven of his associates received lesser sentences. Since the crackdown in Macau, the 14K triad resurfaced in various cities such as Los Angeles, San Francisco and Chicago in the United States; Vancouver, Calgary and Toronto in Canada; Sydney in Australia; and also the UK.

Structure and membership

Structure 
The 14K Triad is essentially just made up of a number of sub-triads that are only symbolically part of the triad through having similar organizational structure and personal networks. They are decentralized and highly flexible with no overarching leader that commands the Triad as a whole.

Traditional Triad Structure goes as follows: The leader of a triad is known as the 489 or the San Chu, the second in command is usually split up into two different roles called the Vanguard or the Incense master with the role number of 438. The Vanguard is in command of recruiting while the Incense master leads the ceremonial rituals. Next in the chain of command are the Red Poles or 426s who are the enforcers for the triad, the 415 or White Paper Fans who handle administrative work, and the 432 or Straw Handles who acts as the mediator between other triads. Regular members with no leadership roles are just called soldiers or 49s.

Recruiting 
The typical target for recruitment is the youth. In California there have been cases of 14K members recruiting teens in Asian densely populated areas such as San Francisco or Orange County. In Hong Kong, 14K members would usually recruit teens in poorer areas such as Kowloon, Kwun Tong, or Tuen Mun while also targeting certain schools.

Role of women 
Regarding the role of women, they have a relatively small role in the organization as the 14K Triad is a male dominant society.

International activity

Africa

South Africa
Two 14K groups, 14K-Hau and 14K-Ngai, are among seven Chinese criminal organizations operating in South Africa, represented in both Cape Town and Johannesburg, specializing primarily in extortion and abalone trafficking (in 2000, the estimated gross income from the illegal exportation of abalone to Hong Kong was US$32 million).

Asia

Japan
The National Police Agency stated in 1997 that the 14K had been expanding its operations in Japan since the 1980s and had branches in Fukuoka, Osaka, Sapporo and Tokyo, each with at least 1,000 members. The 14K in Japan has been involved in counterfeiting credit cards and has cooperated with yakuza groups in the importation large numbers of illegal Chinese migrants.

Philippines
The 14K triad has been involved in smuggling arms to Abu Sayyaf and has also reportedly cooperated with the Islamic group in laundering and transmitting ransom money, taking a percentage of the ransoms in exchange for their assistance.

Thailand
The 14K is the largest Chinese crime syndicate operating in Thailand. In addition to heroin, the 14K is also involved in the smuggling and sale of the amphetamine ya ba; using Bangkok as a commercial and trafficking base, they transport and distribute the Burmese-manufactured drug to the Thai narcotics industry. The influx of other Chinese gangs and syndicates into Thailand has led to a series of turf wars between the 14K and smaller rival groups, fighting over territory in both Thailand and sections of neighbouring Cambodia.

Europe

Belgium and the Netherlands
The 14K triad has been active in the Netherlands since as early as the 1970s, when members of the gang controlled Chinese restaurants in numerous cities in the country. Dutch police authorities believe that the 14K took full control of heroin importation into the Benelux countries in 1987. The line established by the 14K is a direct connection with Hong Kong via Bangkok, the chief transit point. In the Netherlands, the 14K is divided into seven-to-ten-person cells (mainly in Amsterdam) that function as relay posts for moving heroin elsewhere in Europe. However, authorities believe that Belgium now plays an equally important role; heroin laboratories that were discovered in the Netherlands have been reassembled in Flanders, with strong bases in Brussels and Antwerp. A foothold in Belgium also has brought the narcotics traffickers closer to the money-laundering banks of Luxembourg. In 1998, the chief of Belgium's security agency stated of Chinese criminal organizations in the country: "They include several hundred Asiatics and have a strong familial characteristic. Their activities are very diverse, also including [besides narcotics] gambling and illegal workshops. They also are developing money laundering, both small-scale (restaurants, etc.) and large-scale such as real estate and even industrial projects." For example, the 14K controls illegal gambling casinos in Antwerp. Belgium and the Netherlands form two corners of a triangular narcotics route of the 14K Triad; the third corner is Paris.

France
The 14K is among the leading triads in France, where it has cooperated with Turkish, Albanian and Nigerian crime groups in heroin trafficking.

Ireland
The first reported triad activity in Ireland came in July 1979 when the 14K attempted a takeover of a Dublin-based Chinese gang's protection rackets which led to a deadly gang fight resulting in two deaths. Tony Lee, allegedly a high-ranking member of the 14K's Cork branch, was killed along with Michael Tsin of the rival Dublin faction. In August 1983, twelve members of the 14K were arrested in Limerick in connection with attempting to extort money from the owners of Chinese restaurant in the city. Nine of the men were believed to have come over from the UK. During the operation, a hoard of weapons including knives, pickaxes, bars and clubs were found. The 14K and other triads gained a firm foothold in Ireland in the 1980s when large numbers of Chinese restaurants opened in Cork and Dublin. The triad association is still very much active but now operate in smaller groups run by members and distant relatives of the Nam and Tsin family. Underbosses, bosses and high ranking soldiers are believed to have "14K" tattooed on them using ink mixed with blood that's been blessed by Kuang Kong. This dilutes the ink and gives a faded effect which symbolises life in purgatory.

Leaked diplomatic cables obtained by the Irish Independent in 2011 included intelligence reports by the Garda Síochána (Irish police) on Chinese organized crime in the country, specifically the activities of the 14K and their rival Wo Shing Wo. The reported criminal activities of the triads included the trafficking of women and children from China into Ireland, involvement in casinos, and money laundering. Gardaí also reported a great deal of interaction between the Chinese gangs operating in Ireland and Scotland.

Spain
The 14K has a branch in Spain, operating from Madrid.

United Kingdom

The 14K was the first triad society to arrive in the United Kingdom, emerging from the Chinese communities of London, Birmingham, Liverpool and Manchester during the post-war period. Although nearly all triad groups operating in the UK at the time were affiliated with the 14K, each operated independently of the Hong Kong 14K and generally viewed each other as rivals. Other triad societies did not arrive in the country until 1964 when the Labour Party encouraged large-scale immigration, bringing a huge influx of Hong Kong diaspora.

While active predominantly in Birmingham and the north of England, the 14K also has a strong presence in London where they have been involved in turf wars with their rival Wo Shing Wo as well as Fujianese snakehead gangs. On 3 June 2003, alleged 14K member You Yi He, who was the subject of a police investigation into people-smuggling at the time of his death, was shot and killed in London's Chinatown. The 14K has also battled Wo Shing Wo for control of rackets in Glasgow. Additionally, the two groups have also cooperated in cigarette smuggling in Scotland. In July 2003, 14K members were ambushed in a machete attack on Glasgow's Sauchiehall Street by Wo Shing Wo in a dispute over the control of protection rackets.

North America

Canada
The 14K has been among the most active triad societies in Canada, maintaining a chapter in Toronto. Initially, the group was made up of members from Hong Kong but later recruited from the Vietnamese community, while also absorbing the remnants of the defunct Ghost Shadows. In 1988, the Criminal Intelligence Service Canada (CISC) estimated the number of members in the 14K's Toronto branch at 150, with around 40 criminally active in heroin trafficking, migrant smuggling, theft and extortion. The Sam Gor syndicate is composed of 14K and other Triads and has Canadian roots in and leadership from the Big Circle Boys.

Mexico
Intelligence reports from the Attorney General of Mexico and the Philippine Drug Enforcement Agency have indicated that the 14K triad is among the suppliers of raw materials used in the manufacturing of methamphetamine to the Sinaloa Cartel.

United States
The 14K has a presence in New York, California, Chicago, Boston and Houston. The 14K has had connections to the leadership of the Ping On triad in Boston and Wah Ching in San Francisco.

High-ranking 14K member Hui Sin Ma aka Frank Ma, who was born in China but illegally immigrated to the U.S. in the 1980s, began his criminal career in Boston and San Francisco before eventually settling in Queens, New York where he became associated with the On Leong Tong and their youth gang the Ghost Shadows, as well as the Hip Sing Tong along with their youth gang the Flying Dragons. In Queens, he oversaw heroin dealing, illegal gambling, a luxury car-theft ring, extortion rackets and immigrant smuggling. Ma ordered numerous killings to protect his criminal enterprise. In 1996, he fled to China to avoid detection by police, but later returned to the U.S. and was arrested in 2003. In 2010, he was convicted of murder and narcotics charges and sentenced to life in prison. Frank Ma was described by law enforcement as "one of the last of the Asian godfathers."

Oceania

Australia
The 14K is among the main groups responsible for meth trafficking in Australia.

New Zealand
New Zealand police have stated that the 14K is the most powerful Asian crime syndicate operating in the country, where they are involved in the importation of pseudoephedrine (a chemical precursor in the illicit manufacture of methamphetamine) from Hong Kong and mainland China which they sell to local drug trafficking gangs, the Head Hunters and the Hells Angels.

In August 2008, the 14K was allegedly involved in a high-profile kidnapping of a Chinese family near Papatoetoe, Auckland. The plan was to demand a ransom, but they were found before the money was paid.

See also
 Tiandihui
 Green Gang
 Bamboo Union
 Tung Kuei-sen
 Chen Chi-li

References 

Triad groups
Kuomintang
Organised crime groups in Australia
Organised crime groups in Belgium
Organized crime groups in Canada
Gangs in Toronto
Organized crime groups in China
Organised crime groups in England
Gangs in Birmingham, West Midlands
Organised crime gangs of London
Gangs in Liverpool
Gangs in Manchester
Organized crime groups in France
Organised crime groups in Hong Kong
Organised crime groups in Ireland
Organized crime groups in Japan
Organized crime groups in Macau
Organized crime groups in Mexico
Organised crime groups in the Netherlands
Organised crime groups in New Zealand
Organized crime groups in the Philippines
Organised crime groups in Scotland
Organised crime groups in South Africa
Organised crime groups in Spain
Organised crime groups in Thailand
Organized crime groups in the United States
Chinese-American gangs
Gangs in California
Gangs in Chicago
Gangs in Massachusetts
Gangs in New York City
Gangs in Texas
Gangs in Hawaii
Gangs in South Korea
1945 establishments in China